Klopfer is a German occupational surname, derived from the Middle High German klopfen, meaning "to pound, bang, or hammer", and thus indicating a person in the clothing trade, mining or metal working. The name may refer to:

Bruno Klopfer (1900–1971), German psychologist
Donald S. Klopfer (1902–1986), American businessman
Eric Klopfer (born 1970), American educator
Eugen Klöpfer (1886–1950), German actor
George Klopfer (c. 1945 – 2019), American physician
Gerhard Klopfer (1905–1987), German Nazi official
Goetz Klopfer (born 1942), American race walker
Heini Klopfer (1918–1968), German architect
Klopfer (writer) (born 1980), pseudonym of German writer Christian Schmidt
Regina Klopfer (1903–1991), Hungarian singer
Sonya Klopfer (born 1934), American figure skater

See also
Klöpfer, another name for the Swiss wine grape Räuschling
Schulklopfer, defunct Jewish communal role

References

German-language surnames
Jewish surnames